The 18th Day is the debut studio album by British rapper/singer-songwriter Estelle. The first edition was released on 18 October 2004 and the second edition on 4 April 2005.

The album is almost split into two distinct styles: one half funky, UK R&B hip-hop, with the other more downbeat and soulful. Opening track "1980", the first single, contains a Wall of Sound and lyrics reminiscing about growing up. "Dance Bitch" resembles US hip hop stylings similar to Missy Elliott, while "Go Gone" has a Northern soul sound; "Free" is a bouncy funk number and also served as the second single.

For the ballad "I Wanna Love You" and track "Crazy", Estelle eschews rapping for singing. Final track "I'm Gonna Win" is a dramatic number with uplifting vocals. Estelle was later voted best newcomer at the 2004 MOBO Awards.

Singles
"1980" was released on 19 July 2004. "Free" was released on 4 October 2004. "Go Gone" was released on 29 March 2005.

Track listing

 Notes
 signifies a co-producer.

References

External links
 

Estelle (musician) albums
2004 debut albums
Albums produced by John Legend
Albums produced by Mike Peden
V2 Records albums